Grand Falls-Windsor—Green Bay South, formerly known as Windsor—Springdale, is a defunct provincial electoral district for the House of Assembly of Newfoundland and Labrador, Canada. In 2011, there were 7,004 eligible voters living within the district.

In Central Newfoundland, on the shore of Notre Dame Bay. It includes part of the town of Grand Falls-Windsor. Other communities include South Brook, Beaumont as well as Triton Island, Pelley's Island, Long Island and Sunday Cove Island.

The former district of Green Bay was represented by former Premier Brian Peckford (1979-1989).

The district was abolished in 2015, and was succeeded by the new district of Grand Falls-Windsor-Buchans.

Members of the House of Assembly

Green Bay

Election results 

|-

|-

|-
 
|NDP
|Clyde Bridger
|align="right"|418
|align="right"|11.25%
|align="right"|
|}

|-

|-

|-
 
|NDP
|John L. Whelan
|align="right"|192
|align="right"|5.07%
|align="right"|
|}

References

External links 
Website of the Newfoundland and Labrador House of Assembly

Grand Falls-Windsor
Newfoundland and Labrador provincial electoral districts